Daniel Pinheiro (born 20 April 1972) is a Brazilian former handball player. He competed in the men's tournament at the 1996 Summer Olympics.

References

External links
 

1972 births
Living people
Brazilian male handball players
Olympic handball players of Brazil
Handball players at the 1996 Summer Olympics
Handball players from São Paulo
Pan American Games medalists in handball
Pan American Games silver medalists for Brazil
Medalists at the 1995 Pan American Games
Competitors at the 1995 Pan American Games
20th-century Brazilian people